is a four-volume Japanese yaoi light novel written by Ken Nanbara and illustrated by Sae Momoki. It has been adapted into an anime OVA series animated by TNK. Several drama CDs also based on this light novel have been released.

In June 2008, the anime was licensed for release in English by Media Blasters under their Kitty Media label.

Plot 
Mira Munakata is a first-year high school student involved in a romantic and sexual relationship with his father, a famous actor named Kyōsuke Munakata. When Kyōsuke begins acting strangely, Mira suspects that he is cheating on him. After finding his adoption papers, Mira discovers that he and Kyōsuke may not be related at all, and he believes that Kyōsuke will eventually leave him for Mitsuki, an actress that Kyōsuke is rumored to be in a relationship with. In the midst of this, Mira deals with romantic advances from his childhood friend, Kazuki, and a third-year student from his high school, Takayuki, both of whom are in love with him. Each book in the light novel series introduces a new partner to Mira including his uncle's cousin Munakata Ryousuke in the last book which is not shown in the OVA since the OVA only covers the first book in the four-volume series.

Characters

Mira is a freshman at Hakouh High School. He has a secret affair with his father, Kyōsuke, although at first he believes that he cannot be with this one due to their consanguineous relationship. He develops jealousy by believing that his father was dating the famous movie actress, Mitsuki Utsunomiya. However, a short time later he discovers that he is not the son of Kyōsuke, who actually turns out to be his uncle, and despite this he loves him with an implacable fervor.

Kyōsuke is a famous Hollywood actor. He is Mira's father, with whom he maintains a secret romance. His world revolves around his son and since he was young he has dedicated himself to raising him. It is known that he accepted to take charge of Mira, who is actually his nephew, when he was fourteen years old, because he did not want his older sister, Mitsuki, to lose his chance to be famous. Since then, he has raised Mira as his son.

Childhood friend of Mira's, unrequited love.

Mira biological mother and Kyōsuke older sister.

Son to Mira Munakata's biological mother, Mitsuki. Calls Mira his kitten (子猫ちゃん Koneko-chan) and enters the story as the third consummated love interest of Mira in the second novel.

Mira and Kazuki's childhood friend. He plays the electric guitar as his moe characteristic. Not romantically involved.

Novel only
Kyousuke Munakata's cousin, and the actual father of Mira Munakata who falls in love with Mira Munakata in the last book in the series.

Media

Light novel

References

External links
 Papa to Kiss in the Dark Official site by TNK 
 Papa to Kiss in the Dark Official site by Hakusensha 
 
 

1999 Japanese novels
2005 anime OVAs
Comedy anime and manga
Incest in anime and manga
Drama anime and manga
Kitty Media
Light novels
Romance anime and manga
TNK (company)
Yaoi anime and manga
Yaoi light novels
Incest in fiction